Gadsden High School may refer to:

Gadsden City High School, Gadsden, Alabama
Gadsden County High School, Gadsden County, Florida
Gadsden High School (New Mexico), Anthony, New Mexico
Gadsden High School (Alabama), Gadsden, Alabama (defunct)